was a Japanese composer, and the brother of composer Maki Ishii. His father,  was a prominent Japanese ballet dancer. His Symphonia Ainu won a prize at the 1958 Art Festival, inspiring him to do further work inspired by nationalist primitivism. His musical style appeals directly to the emotions, and shows the influence of Carl Orff. In addition to orchestral and vocal music, he has written extensively for the stage, including 6 operas, 3 ballets and 9 film scores, including the 1962 science-fiction film Gorath. Ishii accepted a position as professor at Shōwa College of Music in 1986.

Selected works
Marimo (ballet)
Sinfonia Ainu for soprano, chorus and orchestra
Suite from Marimo for orchestra
Going in a Wide Plain for wind orchestra
Music for Percussions by Eight Players
Sonata for viola and piano (1962)
Preludes for piano
The Music for Flute (flute solo)
Songs of a Withered Tree and the Sun for male chorus and piano
Japanese Folk Songs for voice and piano
Gorath (film score)

References 
Kanazawa, Masakata. "Kan Ishii", Grove Music Online, ed. L. Macy (accessed 20 May 2006), grovemusic.com (subscription access).

1921 births
2009 deaths
20th-century classical composers
20th-century Japanese composers
20th-century Japanese male musicians
Deaths from pneumonia in Japan
Japanese classical composers
Japanese male classical composers
Musicians from Tokyo